Ann Farrell (born 1960 or 1961) is a Canadian retired Paralympic athlete. She competed at the 1980 and 1984 Paralympics in Athletics. Farrell is an amputee, having lost her lower left leg in a train accident when she was four years old.

References

Living people
1960s births
Canadian female swimmers
Paralympic swimmers of Canada
Medalists at the 1980 Summer Paralympics
Medalists at the 1984 Summer Paralympics
People from Botwood
Paralympic gold medalists for Canada
Paralympic bronze medalists for Canada
Paralympic medalists in athletics (track and field)
Athletes (track and field) at the 1980 Summer Paralympics
Athletes (track and field) at the 1984 Summer Paralympics
Paralympic track and field athletes of Canada
Canadian female sprinters
Canadian female discus throwers
Canadian female javelin throwers
Canadian female shot putters
20th-century Canadian women
21st-century Canadian women